The Pennant was an automobile marque of the Barley Motor Car Co. in Kalamazoo, Michigan (1924–25) for taxicabs. Barley  also made the Roamer (1916–29) and the Barley automobiles (1922–24). The Pennant was a continuation of the Barley configured for taxi service.

History 

Albert C. Barley sold his interest in Roamer in 1924 and the Kalamazoo factory remained the Barley Motor Car Co. and continued to manufacture the Barley. When sales were disappointing, the Pennant taxicab was phased in.  It was a Barley with a Buda 4-cylinder engine and targeted at the taxicab market. Its main competitor was the Checker, also built in Kalamazoo.

The Pennant trade dress was a maroon upper body and ivory lower body. Both the Barley and Pennant were discontinued by 1926. After the 1924 reorganization, the Roamer Motor Car Co. was incorporated at Toronto, Ontario, where it was headed by George P. Wigginton. The plan was to move production to Ontario, but this never occurred.  A. C. Barley was back in charge of Roamer by 1927.

See also
 Standard Pennant
 Barley Motor Car Co.
 The Pennant Taxicab at SecondChanceGarage

References

Defunct motor vehicle manufacturers of the United States
1920s cars
Vintage vehicles
Motor vehicle manufacturers based in Michigan
Taxi vehicles
Cars introduced in 1924